Eastlake High School (ELH or EHS), in Chula Vista, California, United States, is a four-year high school which opened on September 8, 1992. The school is located just east of California State Route 125 in the neighborhood of Eastlake, a suburb located southeast of Downtown San Diego. The movie Bring It On, was partially filmed at the school's football stadium.

The Ruth Chapman Performing Arts Center, located on campus, is used for band and orchestra concerts, dance performances, plays, church services, and other community events. The school also features an amphitheatre for pep rallies. The school also features an observatory and an engineering department.

Academic Performance
The school received an Academic Performance Index score of 854 for the 2012 school year, which was the highest score by a high school in the Sweetwater Union High School District.

Sports

Fall Sports:
- American football
- Girls' Volleyball
- Cheerleading
- Girls' Golf- Metro League Champs
- Cross Country
- Boys' Water Polo
- Field Hockey

Winter Sports
- Boys' Basketball
- Girls' Basketball
- Boys' Soccer
- Girls' Soccer
- Wrestling/ Girls & Boys
- Girls' Water Polo
- Roller Hockey

Spring Sports:
- Baseball
- Softball
- Track and Field
- Boys & Girls' Volleyball
- Boys' Tennis
- Boys' Golf
-Girls' Gymnastics
- Swim & Dive
- Lacrosse

Notable alumni
 Valentino Arteaga, drummer for Lower Definition and Of Mice & Men
 Katya Echazarreta, First Mexican Woman to Fly in Space
 Adrián González, Major League Baseball first baseman 
 Tony Jefferson, NFL Defensive Back
 Marcelo Mayer, first-round selection in the 2021 MLB draft
 Eddy Marshburn, lead guitarist of the band Lower Definition
 Stefan Toler bass guitarist of the band Lower Definition
 William Dunkle, offensive guard for the Pittsburgh Steelers
 Casey Schmitt, 3rd baseman for the San Francisco Giants

References

External links
School website

Educational institutions established in 1992
High schools in San Diego County, California
Public high schools in California
1992 establishments in California
Education in Chula Vista, California